Chisamba Lungu (born 31 January 1991) is a Zambian professional footballer who plays as a midfielder for Nkwazi. He is also a Zambian international. He primarily plays as an attacking midfielder and a winger.

Career
Lungu was born in Kafue, Zambia.

In August 2017, Lungu joined Alanyaspor on a three-year contract. He made his league debut for the club on 25 August 2017 in a 1–1 home draw with Kardemir Karabükspor. He was brought on in the 15th minute for an injured Isaac Sackey.

On 27 February 2018, Lungu returned to Zambia, signing with Buildcon.

In November 2018, Lungu signed for fellow Zambia Super League club Nkana.

Lungu joined Nkwazi in November 2022.

Career statistics

Club

International

Statistics accurate as of match played 7 October 2017

International goals

Scores and results list Zambia's goal tally first, score column indicates score after each Lungu goal.

Honours
Ural
Russian National Football League: 2012–13

Zambia
Africa Cup of Nations: 2012

References

External links
 
 

1991 births
Living people
Zambian footballers
Zambian expatriate footballers
FC Zugdidi players
Association football defenders
Expatriate footballers in Georgia (country)
Expatriate footballers in Turkey
Expatriate footballers in Russia
FC Ural Yekaterinburg players
Alanyaspor footballers
Erovnuli Liga players
Russian Premier League players
Zambian expatriate sportspeople in Russia
Zambian expatriate sportspeople in Turkey
Zambian expatriate sportspeople in Georgia (country)
People from Kafue District
Zambia international footballers
Zambia under-20 international footballers
Zambia youth international footballers
2012 Africa Cup of Nations players
2013 Africa Cup of Nations players
Zanaco F.C. players
2015 Africa Cup of Nations players
Africa Cup of Nations-winning players
Buildcon F.C. players
Nkana F.C. players
Nkwazi F.C. players